Vailuluu is a volcanic seamount discovered in 1975. The basaltic seamount is considered to mark the current location of the Samoa hotspot. The summit of Vailuluu contains a 2 km wide, 400 m deep oval-shaped caldera. Two principal rift zones extend east and west from the summit, parallel to the trend of the Samoan hotspot. A third less prominent rift extends southeast of the summit.

Eruptions at Vailuluu were recorded in 1973. An earthquake swarm in 1995 may have been related to an eruption from the seamount. Turbid water above the summit shows evidence of ongoing hydrothermal plume activity. Vailuluʻu may breach the surface of the ocean and officially become an island if a high rate of eruptions continue.

Name and research history 

The seamount was first discovered in 1975 after seismic activity, including earthquakes, was noted in the area and was originally known as either Rockne Volcano or Fa'afafine seamount. The name Vailulu'u refers to a sacred rain that supposedly fell with every gathering of the last king of Samoa; it was assigned by Samoan high school students in 2000. The Nafanua cone is named after a Samoan war goddess, Nafanua. Today the seamount is part of the National Marine Sanctuary of American Samoa.

Geography and geomorphology 
Even farther west lie Ofu-Olosega and Muli, while Malumalu Seamount is located south of Ofu-Olosega. Rose Atoll and Malulu Seamount are located southeast from Vailulu'u.

The seamount has a star-like shape, with two prominent ridges east and west and a somewhat less prominent ridge south of the volcano; it also features smaller ridges at its foot and amphitheatre-shaped scars from landslides. A saddle at a depth of  depth connects it to Ta'u.

Prior to the formation of the cone, the crater contained several pit craters; it is possible that the crater was once occupied by a higher cone, which might have risen to shallow depths. The Nafanua cone consists mostly of pillow lavas.

Hydrothermal vents 

Hydrothermal vents are found at a number of sites within the crater with varied characteristics, including high and low temperature vents. The hydrothermal activity influences the waters within the crater, making them turbid and warmer than the water in the free ocean. Low temperature hydrothermal vents are found on the western ridge of Vailuluʻu as well.

The hydrothermal fluids vented at the Northern Moat Hydrothermal Complex appear to be rich in sulfides, and droplets of carbon dioxide have been observed in the vented fluids.

The total power of the hydrothermal system is estimated to be 610-760 megawatts and it forms substantial hydrothermal plumes in the crater; the altered water extends some distance from the volcano.

Geology 

Vailulu'u lies at the eastern end of the Samoan volcanic chain and is considered to be the present-day location of the Samoa hotspot; this interpretation is based on both the position of the seamount and the isotope ratios of rocks taken from it. Young rock ages have also been observed on Malumalu Seamount, implying that the hotspot is currently feeding both volcanoes and forming two separate volcanic chains. These two volcanoes are the endpoints of two separate volcano lineaments in the Samoa islands.

Samoa is located just northeast of the northern corner of the Tonga Trench, where the Pacific Plate is subducting. This proximity to the trench is probably the reason why the older volcanic islands all display recent volcanic activity, such as activity from 1905-1911 on Savaii and originally led to proposals of a non-hotspot origin of the Samoa islands. However, the islands' formation shows an eastward trend and evidence of age progression, which has been interpreted as reflecting an age progressive chain of volcanoes that begins at Vailulu'u and at Malumalu Seamount. The Malulu Seamount and Rose Island east of Vailulu'u do not appear related to the Samoa hotspot system,.  On the other side of the volcanic chain are the seamounts Lalla Rookh Bank, Combe Bank and Alexa Bank which are older products of the Samoa hotspot.

The origin of the Samoan volcanic chain has been explained with either a hotspot influenced by the Tonga Trench or by cracking of the Pacific crust; today the preferred theory is that the Samoan chain is a hotspot-generated volcanic chain while the "anomalous" younger volcanism is produced through an interaction between the islands and the Tonga Trench and a neighboring transform fault. This hotspot is under the influence of the mantle flows triggered by the Tonga Trench, which distort the rising plume and also changes its upwelling flux. This interaction has only begun recently.

Composition 

Alkali basalts and picrites have been dredged from the volcano. The volcanic rocks on Vailulu'u reflect a magma suite called "end-member magma type 2" (EM2)  although there are noticeable differences between the geochemistries of various volcanic units at Vailulu'u.

Evidence of hydrothermal alteration includes quartz in rock samples. Iron oxide chimneys with sizes measured in centimetres to metres have been formed by low temperature hydrothermal venting. Hydrothermal sulfide and oxide deposits may become targets for mining.

Biology 

Various bacteria live on Vailulu'u, including in microbial mats on basalts, which are related to bacteria from Tangaroa Seamount in the Kermadec Ridge, Kamaʻehuakanaloa Seamount in Hawaii and in the East Pacific Rise. A number of mostly pigmented yeasts and other fungi have been identified in deposits from the Nafanua Cone and in iron mats and might play important roles in the ecosystems of Vailulu'u.

The widespread production of siderophores by microorganisms may not only serve to make iron available to them but also to reduce the trapping of the organisms within iron oxides.

Sulfur, manganese and iron may serve as electron donors in organism metabolism at Vailulu'u; hydrogen sulfide, iron, manganese and methane-oxidizing Gammaproteobacteria have been encountered.

Demosponges have been observed in breaches of the crater rim and presumably rely on incoming nutrient-rich water from the ocean, while crinoids, gorgonians, ophiuroids and sponges have been found on the western rift zone of Vailulu'u. In non-hydrothermal areas, echinoderms, octocorals and sponges dominate the surfaces, and crabs, eels, octocorals and octopuses have been observed in the summit areas. The eel populations have given that part of the volcano the nickname "Eel City"; the eels subsist on food species transported by ocean currents, such as crustaceans.

There are differences between the animal fauna in various parts of the volcano. For example, the oxygenated waters and availability of shrimp as food source attract eels to the summit of Nafanua, while the crater floor displays a high animal mortality and is called the "moat of death"; polychaetes feeding on dead fish have been found on the crater floor. This is due to the very low availability of oxygen for respiration at the crater floor, unlike at the summit of Nafanua cone.

Eruption history 

Vailulu'u is an active volcano, with earthquakes, volcanic eruptions and hydrothermal activity recorded. In particular, the seamount is a site with common earthquakes in this otherwise mostly aseismic part of the Pacific Plate and away from the earthquakes of the Tonga Trench, recording an average 4 earthquakes per day. Seismic swarms were observed in 1973 and 1995; an earthquake swarm took place in 2000. The hypocentres of these earthquakes appear to coincide with the hydrothermal areas and the earthquakes correlate with the southeastern ridge, which is a rift zone.

Disequilibria in thorium and uranium isotopes of rock samples taken from the seamount indicate that Vailulu'u was frequently active in the last 8,000 years and that eruptions within the summit crater took place in the last hundred years. Dredge samples showed fresh rocks; radiometric dating produced ages of less than ten years according to 1984 and 1999 publications.

The seismic swarm in 1973 appears to have been a major submarine eruption. The last eruption, between 2001 and 2004, went unobserved and formed the Nafanua volcanic cone; for the most part, the shape of the volcano has not changed over time. Repeated eruptions like the one that formed Nafanua could cause Vailulu'u to emerge from the sea. The summit of Vailulu'u is shallow enough that explosive eruptions may occur which can affect coastal communities and ships. It appears that isostatic effects from the growth of the seamount may have altered shorelines on Tutuila.

Gallery

References

Sources

External links
NOAA Ocean Explorer Vailuluʻu 2005 Expedition, Retrieved 30 August 2007
Vailuluʻu web site, information about the Vailuluʻu seamount
 

Volcanoes of American Samoa
Calderas of Oceania
Submarine calderas
Submarine volcanoes
Seamounts of the Pacific Ocean